The 2017 Jin'an Open was a professional tennis tournament played on outdoor hard courts. It was the first (women) and second (men) editions of the tournament and part of the 2017 ITF Women's Circuit and the 2017 ITF Men's Circuit, offering a total of $60,000 (women) and $25,000 (men) in prize money. It took place in Lu'an, China, from 22–28 May for women and 29 May–4 June for men.

Point distribution

Women's singles main draw entrants

Seeds 

 1 Rankings as of 15 May 2017

Other entrants 
The following players received wildcards into the singles main draw:
  Gai Ao
  Guo Shanshan
  Ren Jiaqi
  Wei Zhanlan

The following players received entry from the qualifying draw:
  Suzy Larkin
  Tang Qianhui
  Yuan Yue
  Zheng Wushuang

The following player received entry by a lucky loser:
  Ye Qiuyu

Men's singles main draw entrants

Seeds 

 1 Rankings as of 22 May 2017

Other entrants 
The following players received wildcards into the singles main draw:
  Hui Tianxiang
  Wu Di
  Zhang Ze
  Zhang Zhizhen

The following players received entry from the qualifying draw:
  Feng He
  Lin Wei-de
  Lo Chien-hsun
  Qi Xi
  Olly Sadler
  Tan Li-wie
  Wang Chukang
  Wu Hao

Champions

Men's singles
 Alexander Sarkissian def.  Zhang Zhizhen, 6–2, 6–1

Women's singles

 Zhu Lin def.  Ankita Raina, 6–3, 3–6, 6–4

Men's doubles
 Harry Bourchier /  Kaichi Uchida def.  Lo Chien-hsun /  Zhou Shenghao, 6–3, 7–5

Women's doubles

 Jiang Xinyu /  Tang Qianhui def.  Mana Ayukawa /  Erika Sema, 7–5, 6–4

External links 
 2017 Jin'an Open (women) at ITFtennis.com
 2017 Jin'an Open (men) at ITFtennis.com

2017 in Chinese tennis
2017 ITF Women's Circuit
2017 ITF Men's Circuit
Jin